Leckford is a village and civil parish in Hampshire, England. It lies on the eastern bank of the River Test just to the south of its confluence with the River Anton, to the east of Longstock and south of Chilbolton.

The parish church, St Nicholas's, has a 13th-century core, rebuilt in the 16th century and much restored since. Leckford was on the Andover Canal, which later became the Andover and Redbridge Railway, but did not have a station. The route through Leckford today is used by the Test Way long-distance footpath. In the Second World War, Leckford shared a boundary with Chilbolton Aerodrome, which was used by the RAF and later by US Army Air Forces.

The parish contains the Leckford Estate, owned by the John Lewis Partnership.

See also
 Leckford Road, Oxford

References

External links

Villages in Hampshire
Test Valley